Guzmania sanguinea is a species of plant in the family Bromeliaceae. This species is native to Trinidad and Tobago, Costa Rica (including Costa Rican islands in the Pacific), Panama, Colombia, Venezuela, Ecuador, and northern Brazil.

Varieties
Three varieties are recognized:

Guzmania sanguinea var. brevipedicellata Gilmartin - Ecuador
Guzmania sanguinea var. comosa H.E.Luther - Colombia, Ecuador
Guzmania sanguinea var. sanguinea - most of species range

Cultivars 
 Guzmania 'Colombian Gold'
 Guzmania 'Hades'
 Guzmania 'Pink Nova'
 Guzmania 'Tricolor'

References

sanguinea
Flora of South America
Flora of Central America
Flora of Trinidad and Tobago
Plants described in 1883
House plants
Taxa named by Carl Christian Mez
Taxa named by Édouard André
Flora without expected TNC conservation status